Xianning is a prefecture-level city in southeastern Hubei province, People's Republic of China, bordering Jiangxi to the southeast and Hunan to the southwest. It is known as the "City of Osmanthus".

Geography and climate
Xianning is located in southeastern Hubei province, just south of Wuhan, between the southern bank of the Yangtze River in the north and the Mufu Mountains in the south. It borders Jiangxi to the southeast and Hunan to the southwest. It is called Hubei's southern gateway. Xianning is hilly and mountainous (especially in its southern part), with some flatlands (mostly in the north) and lakes. It was home to 2,462,583 inhabitants as of the 2010 census whom 512,517 lived in the built-up (or metro) area made of Xia'nan District. Its proximity to Wuhan is transforming the city into an outer suburb of the Hubei's capital.

Xianning has a humid subtropical climate (Köppen Cfa).

History 
Xianning was under the jurisdiction of Nanjun County during the Qin dynasty. At the end of the Han dynasty, Xianning became a strategic point where conflict occurred; Xianning is a likely site for the Battle of Red Cliffs. During the Cultural Revolution, it was an important area for the Hunan, Hubei and Jiangxi Revolutionary Bases.

Administration
Xianning has 1 district, 4 counties, 1 county-level city and 1 other area.

District:
Xian'an District (location of Xianning's main urban area, i.e. the place that  low-resolution maps would label as "Xianning")

Counties:
Tongshan County
Chongyang County
Tongcheng County
Jiayu County

City:
Chibi City

Other Area:
Xianning Advanced Technology Industry Area

Demographics
As of the 2020 Chinese census, Xianning has a total population of 2,658,316 people, of whom 657,590 lived in the built-up (or metro) area made of Xian'an District. Most of the inhabitants of Xianning are Han; only 4,785 are from other ethnic groups including Hui, Tujia, Zhuang, Miao, Manchu, and Dong. The place with the largest ethnic minority population is in Chibi City.

Economy

Agriculture and forestry are two of Xianning's biggest industries. It is known by the three names, "City of Osmanthus", "City of Nan Bamboo", and "City of Tea". There are more than 1 million mu (~151,822 English acres) of "Nan" Bamboo, 30,000 Chinese acres of osmanthus, and more than 150,000 Chinese acres of tea.

Mineral resources are also an important part of Xianning's economy. Niobium, gold, magnesium, antimony, monazite, coal, manganese, vanadium, mica, and marble are all mined or quarried in Xianning.

Xianning Nuclear Power Plant is under construction near Dafan Town, Tongshan County. On 17 August 2010, the Shaw Group announced an agreement with State Nuclear Power Engineering Corp. Ltd., a subsidiary of China's State Nuclear Power Technology Corp. Ltd. (SNPTC), to add two new AP1000 units at the Xianning Nuclear Power Plant.

Transportation
Xianning has major rail lines, including the Beijing-Guangzhou line, many national highways, and a large stretch of the Yangtze River, making it an important transportation and shipping center. 

As of 2015, four different train stations located in or near Xianning's main urban area have "Xianning" in their name; several other stations are located elsewhere within the prefecture-level city.

There are two passenger train stations on the "conventional" Beijing-Guangzhou line within the Prefecture-level city of Xianning - the Xianning Railway Station in urban area itself ( from Wuhan's Wuchang train station), and the one in Chibi ( from Wuchang) - are usually the first and the second stops for the slower trains leaving Wuchang toward Changsha and Guangzhou. Typical travel times from Wuchang is 40-50 min and 1 hour 20 min, respectively.

The Wuhan–Xianning Intercity Railway (part of the future Wuhan Metropolitan Area Intercity Railway system), opened in December 2013, provides direct rail service from Wuhan's Wuchang Railway Station to Xianning city center. It has two stations in the city's main urban area: Xianning East Railway Station in the downtown Xianning, and Xianning South, the end-of-line (dead-end) station in the industrial area south of downtown. When the system was under construction, the expected travel time from Wuchang to Xianning was stated to be 28 min, but as of 2015, the typical scheduled time from Wuchang to Xianning South is more like 70 to 100 min.

Tourism

Xianning's biggest tourist draw is its natural scenery. There are many sites including Taiyi Cave, Star Bamboo Sea, Mount Jiugong (in Tongshan County), Lushui Lake, as well as the historical site the Chibi Ancient Ruins.

The Xianning Sports Centre Stadium is located in the city. It has a capacity of 12,000 and it attracts many football fans from the region.

Sister city
  Victoria, Labuan, Malaysia.

References

External links

Xianning City People's Government, Official Website 

 
Populated places on the Yangtze River
Prefecture-level divisions of Hubei
Wuhan urban agglomeration
Cities in Hubei